Geoffrey Roy Long (born about 1930) is a former Australian rules footballer who played for City/City-South, in the Northern Tasmanian Football Association (NTFA) from 1948 to 1960, won a number of awards and played at representative level.

Long, who played his football mostly at centre half forward, won City-South's 'Best and fairest' award in 1954 and was a member of six premiership teams. At interstate level he appeared in the 1953, 1956 and 1958 carnivals, gaining All-Australian selection for his performances in 1956. Amongst his 16 interstate matches for Tasmania he won a Lefroy Medal in 1955 and also represented the NTFA 29 times.

After retiring, Long served Tasmanian football as an administrator. He was a NTFA and Tasmanian selector from 1966 to 1979 and President of the NTFA from 1977 to 1979.

He was one of the inaugural 'Legends' inducted into the Tasmanian Football Hall of Fame in 2005.

Honours and achievements
Team
NTFA Premiership
 City/City-South 1952, 1953, 1954, 1956, 1959, 1960

Individual
 All Australian 1956
 NTFA Best & Fairest (2nd) 1953, (3rd) 1954, (eq 4th) 1952
 club Best & Fairest (1st) 1954, (2nd) 1953, (3rd) 1949, 1951

References

Specific

Tasmanian Football Hall of Fame inductees
Australian rules footballers from Tasmania
Northern Tasmanian Football Association (1886–1986) administrators
All-Australians (1953–1988)
City-South Football Club players
Living people
Year of birth uncertain
Year of birth missing (living people)